Olivier Toubia is the Glaubinger Professor of Business at Columbia Business School, Columbia University. He is known for his work on innovation, idea generation and conjoint analysis.

References

Living people
Columbia University faculty
Year of birth missing (living people)